Justin Morrow (born October 4, 1987) is an American retired professional soccer player. Morrow is the executive director of Black Players for Change, which in 2020 won the MLS Humanitarian of the Year Award.

College and amateur career 
Morrow attended Saint Ignatius High School, where he was an adidas/NSCAA high school All-American.

He played college soccer at the University of Notre Dame. He was a Big East Academic All-Star in both his sophomore and junior years as well as his team's captain during his senior season. He made 89 appearances and scored seven goals during his college career.

While in college, Morrow also played for the Indiana Invaders, the Cleveland Internationals, and the Chicago Fire Premier in the USL Premier Development League. During the 2009 season he helped the Fire to the 2009 PDL championship game.

Club career

San Jose Earthquakes 

Morrow was drafted in the second round, 28th overall, of the 2010 MLS SuperDraft by the San Jose Earthquakes.

Morrow made his professional debut and scored his first goal on April 14, 2010 in a U.S. Open Cup game against Real Salt Lake. He made his MLS debut on May 1, 2010 against the Colorado Rapids.

After struggling to break in the first XI, Morrow was sent on loan to USSF Division 2 club FC Tampa Bay on September 7, 2010.  He returned to the San Jose roster for the start of the 2011 season but was again loaned to FC Tampa Bay on July 14, 2011. This loan was short-lived as Morrow was recalled to San Jose on July 25, 2011.

Morrow broke out in 2012, starting 33 matches as the Earthquakes were surprise Supporters' Shield winners. He was named to his first All-Star game.

Toronto FC 

He was traded to Toronto FC following the 2013 season. Toronto FC blog Waking the Red named Morrow the team's MVP for the 2014 season.

On December 10, 2016, following a 0–0 draw against Seattle Sounders in the 2016 MLS Cup Final at BMO Field, Morrow missed Toronto's sixth penalty in the resulting shoot-out, which allowed Román Torres to clinch the title for Seattle after netting the subsequent spot kick.

In the 2017 MLS regular season, Morrow scored his first career hat-trick in the club's 4–2 home win against New York Red Bulls on September 30, 2017, which earned Toronto FC their first ever Supporters' Shield.

On February 23, 2021, Morrow re-signed with Toronto FC.

On September 16, 2021, Toronto FC announced that Morrow will retire from professional soccer following the 2021 season. He played his final match on November 7, 2021 against D.C. United, being given the captain's armband for the match and substituted out in stoppage time to a standing ovation from the crowd.

International career 
Following his successful 2012 MLS season, Morrow was called up to the national team for the first time. He started in a draw against Canada in a January 2013 friendly. He was an unused sub in two 2014 World Cup qualifiers against Costa Rica and Mexico in March 2013. Morrow would return to the national team in 2017, being named to the 2017 CONCACAF Gold Cup roster. He would earn his second cap with the squad, starting and playing the full 90 minutes, in the U.S.'s second match of the tournament versus Martinique, which ended in a 3–2 win.

Career statistics

Club

International

Honors

Club 
San Jose Earthquakes
 Supporters' Shield: 2012

 Toronto FC
MLS Cup: 2017; Runner-up 2016, 2019
 Supporters' Shield: 2017
 Canadian Championship: 2016, 2017, 2018; Runner-up 2019
CONCACAF Champions League: Runner-up 2018
Eastern Conference Winners (Playoffs): 2016, 2017, 2019

International
CONCACAF Gold Cup: 2017

Individual 
 MLS All-Star: 2012
 MLS Best XI: 2017

References

External links

 
 

1987 births
Living people
2017 CONCACAF Gold Cup players
American expatriate soccer players
American soccer players
Association football fullbacks
Chicago Fire U-23 players
Cleveland Internationals players
CONCACAF Gold Cup-winning players
Expatriate soccer players in Canada
Indiana Invaders players
Major League Soccer All-Stars
Major League Soccer players
North American Soccer League players
Notre Dame Fighting Irish men's soccer players
San Jose Earthquakes draft picks
San Jose Earthquakes players
Soccer players from Cleveland
Tampa Bay Rowdies players
Toronto FC players
United States men's international soccer players
USL League Two players
USSF Division 2 Professional League players